The Rikugun Ki-202 Shūsui-Kai (translated as "Autumn Water, improved") was a direct development of the German Messerschmitt Me 163 Komet rocket-powered interceptor aircraft. None were produced before Japan's surrender that ended World War II.

In a split from the development of the Mitsubishi J8M and Mitsubishi Ki-200, the IJA instructed Rikugun to develop a new design based on the Me 163, independent of the IJN's J8M. A fundamental shortcoming of the Me 163, and all other aircraft based on it, was extremely limited endurance, typically only a few minutes. The Imperial Japanese Navy proposed to improve the endurance of the J8M1 by producing a version with only one cannon, thereby saving weight and space for more fuel (the J8M2). The Army, on the other hand, opted to keep both cannon, but enlarge the airframe to accommodate larger tanks, resulting in the Ki-202, which was to have been the definitive Army version of the fighter. Power was to be supplied by a  thrust Mitsubishi Toku Ro.3 (KR20) rocket motor. Undercarriage was to have been a sprung skid and tail-wheel.

Specifications (Ki-202 estimated)

See also

Notes

Bibliography

Ki-202
Ki-202, Mitsubishi
Rocket-powered aircraft
Ki-202, Mitsubishi

ja:秋水#バリエーション